Sclerotium delphinii is a plant pathogen infecting mangoes.

References

External links

Fungal plant pathogens and diseases
Mango tree diseases
Typhulaceae